Chloroflexus aggregans is a thermophilic, filamentous, phototrophic bacterium  that forms dense cell aggregates. Its type strain is strain MD-66 (= DSM 9485).

References

Further reading

External links 
LPSN
Type strain of Chloroflexus aggregans at BacDive -  the Bacterial Diversity Metadatabase

Thermophiles
Chloroflexota